General elections were held in Sudan on 13–16 April 2015 to elect the President and the National Assembly. They were originally scheduled for 2 April, but were delayed by eleven days. These were the first elections to be held following the secession of South Sudan.

Incumbent President Omar al-Bashir won the presidential election by a landslide, amid a boycott from the majority of the opposition. The ruling National Congress of Sudan also won a majority in the 426 seat National Assembly.

Electoral system
The President was elected using the two-round system; if no candidate gained a majority of the vote in the first round, a run-off would have been held.

The 426 members of the National Assembly were elected by three methods; half were elected by majority voting in multi-member constituencies based on the 18 states and containing between two and 36 seats. 128 seats were reserved for women and elected by closed list proportional representation in a single national constituency, whilst a further 85 unreserved seats were elected by the same system.

Conduct

Campaign
Incumbent President Omar al-Bashir was re-selected as the presidential candidate of the National Congress (NCP) in October 2014. Fifteen other candidates registered to contest the elections, although they are relatively unknown.

The majority of opposition parties were boycotting the elections, although a total of 44 parties put forward candidates. However, the ruling NCP opted not to field candidates in 30% of constituencies in order to allow other parties to win seats.

Observers
Election observer missions (EOM) were deployed from the African Union (AU), Arab League, Common Market for Eastern and Southern Africa (COMESA), Intergovernmental Authority on Development (IGAD), Organisation of Islamic Cooperation (OIC); as well as from China, Russia and Turkey.

The African Union's EOM was led by former Nigerian President Olusegun Obasanjo. The AUEOM was "satisfied that voting went on peacefully" and noted that the country "still faces serious challenges to democracy building and national reconciliation". It concluded that the "results.. would reflect the expression of the will of the voters of Sudan".

COMESA EOM noted that the "general environment within which the general elections were organized ha[d] remarkably been peaceful" and commended the Sudanese people. It also noted with concern that the "general elections were boycotted by several opposition political parties".

Results

President

National Assembly

Reactions
On 9 April 2015, the European Union said that there was a "lack of a conducive environment for the upcoming elections" and that it was  disappointed that the Sudanese government missed an opportunity "by not responding to the efforts by the African Union to bring all stakeholders together."

On 20 April 2015; Norway, the United Kingdom and the United States issued a joint statement saying that the Sudanese Government failed "to create a free, fair, and conducive elections environment" and that the "outcome of these elections cannot be considered a credible expression of the will of the Sudanese people". Following this statement, the Sudanese Foreign Ministry summoned the ambassadors from these countries and condemned the statement as "erroneous information and prejudgment of the elections"; and also deemed it as "flagrant intervention in Sudan's internal affairs." President Bashir labeled the critics as "colonialist parties".

On 21 April 2015, the Sudanese Embassy in London issued a statement saying that other international bodies were clearly biased as they refused to even send their observers and "the claim that unrest in some isolated peripheries reduces the validity of elections does not hold water; because Northern Ireland suffered serious “troubles” for decades and that didn't stop UK elections."

On 28 April 2015, the Chinese Foreign Ministry spokesperson Hong Lei said that they respect "the choice made by the Sudanese people" and congratulated President Bashir on his re-election.

President Bashir also received congratulatory messages from President Abdel Fattah el-Sisi of Egypt, King Abdullah of Jordan, Emir Sabah of Kuwait, Sultan Qaboos of Oman, Emir Tamim of Qatar, King Salman of Saudi Arabia and President Khalifa al Nahyan of the United Arab Emirates.

References

External links
 National Election Commission

2015 in Sudan
Elections in Sudan
Sudan
Presidential elections in Sudan
Election and referendum articles with incomplete results